Tales of Ten Worlds is a collection of science fiction short stories by British   writer Arthur C. Clarke. The stories all originally appeared in a number of different publications.

Contents
This collection, originally published in 1962, includes the following:

 "I Remember Babylon"
 "Summertime on Icarus"
 "Out of the Cradle, Endlessly Orbiting..."
 "Who's There?"
 "Hate"
 "Into the Comet"
 "An Ape about the House"
 "Saturn Rising"
 "Let There be Light"
 "Death and the Senator"
 "Trouble With Time"
 "Before Eden"
 "A Slight Case of Sunstroke"
 "Dog Star"
 "The Road to the Sea"

Reception
Avram Davidson received the collection favorably, praising Clarke's stories saying "Few writers in the field handle science with such knowledge as to be so convincing, such deftness as never to place stumbling-blocks, and with such clarity of style as to appear to have none at all."

Editions

References

External links 
 

1962 short story collections
Short story collections by Arthur C. Clarke